Canada On Screen was a special screening series of culturally and artistically significant films from the history of cinema of Canada, which took place in 2017 as part of Canada 150.

The program was screened throughout 2017 as a free screening series at the TIFF Bell Lightbox in Toronto, The Cinematheque in Vancouver, Library and Archives Canada in Ottawa and the Cinémathèque québécoise in Montreal, with some selections from the program screened in other venues across Canada for National Canadian Film Day and other special local events.

Selections

Animation

Television commercials

Documentaries

Experimental film and video

Feature films

Video installation art

Music videos

Short films

Television

References

2017 in Canadian cinema
Toronto International Film Festival